The 2015–16 NEC men's basketball season began with practices in October 2015, followed by the start of the 2015–16 NCAA Division I men's basketball season in November. Conference play started in early January 2016 and will conclude in March with the 2016 Northeast Conference men's basketball tournament.

Preseason

Rankings

() first place votes

All-NEC team

Head coaches

Notes: 
 All records, appearances, titles, etc. are from time with current school only. 
 Year at school includes 2015–16 season.
 Overall and NEC/NCAA records are from time at current school and are before the beginning of the 2015–16 season.
 Previous jobs are head coaching jobs unless otherwise noted.

NEC regular season

Conference matrix
This table summarizes the head-to-head results between teams in conference play. (x) indicates games remaining this season.

Player of the week
Throughout the regular season, the Northeast Conference offices named a player of the week and a freshman of the week each Monday.

Postseason

NEC tournament

  March 2–8, 2016 Northeast Conference Basketball Tournament.

All games will be played at the venue of the higher seed

NCAA tournament

National Invitational tournament

Honors and awards

Milestones and records
On December 10, 2015 the St. Francis Brooklyn Terriers attempted 49 three-pointers against NJIT, the most in conference history in a single game.

See also
2015–16 Northeast Conference women's basketball season

References

External links
NEC website